Andrew Thomas Callaghan (born April 23, 1997) is an American journalist. He is the creator and star of the YouTube series All Gas No Brakes and Channel 5.

Early life 
Andrew Thomas Callaghan was born in Philadelphia on April 23, 1997, and grew up in the Capitol Hill neighborhood of Seattle. He has said that he "hated every class from the first day of kindergarten to [his] last day of college" except for a journalism class he took in his junior year of high school. The teacher of that class convinced him to pursue his passion for journalism. During high school and a gap year before college, he interviewed people associated with the darknet market Silk Road, Occupy Seattle protesters, and juggalos. He later relocated to New Orleans, where he studied journalism on a full scholarship at Loyola University and worked as a doorman on Bourbon Street to support himself. He was a contributing writer for The Maroon, Loyola's university newspaper.

Career

Quarter Confessions 
While working as a doorman on Bourbon Street, Callaghan saw what he described as "hellish scenes" and wanted to find a funny or smart way to document them. He quit his job and began interviewing people on the streets of the city about their darkest secrets while they were intoxicated, which he compiled into a YouTube and Instagram series called Quarter Confessions, named after its location in the French Quarter.

All Gas No Brakes 
In 2019, Callaghan published All Gas, No Brakes: A Hitchhiker's Diary, a memoir-zine recounting stories from a 70-day hitchhiking trip across America that he undertook two years prior at the age of 19. The idea for the YouTube series All Gas No Brakes was conceived from this memoir, before beginning his journalism studies at university. Quarter Confessions led to a partnership between Callaghan and Doing Things Media, who agreed to fund All Gas No Brakes.

In early 2020, Callaghan started an All Gas No Brakes podcast in response to travel restrictions stemming from the COVID-19 pandemic. On the podcast, he interviewed past subjects from his All Gas No Brakes series via video call.

In March 2021, Callaghan announced that he and his team were no longer involved with production of All Gas No Brakes nor the television adaptation that was in development. He wrote on Instagram, "I am no longer associated with All Gas No Brakes. I no longer receive any of the Patreon crowdfunding, YouTube monetization, or any other show income. Nic and Evan, who lived in the RV and created the original show material, are also no longer involved. We have no control over the accounts or future of the show. When I was 20, I wrote a book called All Gas No Brakes about hitchhiking around America as a teenager. At 21, I pitched the idea of a video-based road show to a production company, who loaned me an RV to make videos and explore America with my best friends. I was ecstatic, so I signed an employment contract without reading it. Lesson learned. Thank you for supporting me these past years. It's been the time of my life. I can't wait to show you guys what I'm doing next."

On March 23, 2021, details of Callaghan's contract emerged in The New York Times. Doing Things Media had signed him to a contract granting him a $45,000 salary plus expenses covered in exchange for the intellectual property rights to the All Gas No Brakes brand. Callaghan was required to produce a set amount of content, but was otherwise granted creative freedom. The Patreon page set up for the show also paid out a further 20% to Callaghan, 20% to the crew, and 60% to Doing Things Media. The production company became uncomfortable with the political context of some episodes, specifically those covering the George Floyd protests in Minneapolis. By the end of 2020, Callaghan attempted to renegotiate his contract, which was set to expire in February 2022; he and his crew were locked out of the franchise's social media accounts and were fired in March 2021.

Abso Lutely Productions and This Place Rules 
In May 2020, Doing Things Media and Abso Lutely Productions entered a deal to develop a television series based on All Gas No Brakes. Callaghan said the partnership began when Eric Wareheim, one half of the comedy duo Tim & Eric alongside Tim Heidecker, privately messaged him on Twitter to ask about creating a television series. As the co-founders of Abso Lutely, Wareheim, Heidecker, and Dave Kneebone would serve as executive producers; Callaghan, Reid Hailey, and Max Benator would serve as executive producers for Doing Things Media. Following Callaghan's departure from Doing Things Media, Heidecker confirmed that Abso Lutely would still be working with Callaghan on "something major".

On the Fear & Malding podcast in July 2021, Callaghan revealed he had created a documentary film with Abso Lutely about the 2020 United States presidential election. The title was later revealed to be This Place Rules. Directed and executive produced by Callaghan, the film followed him as he interviewed people involved in events leading up to the January 6 United States Capitol attack. It was released by HBO Max and A24 on December 30, 2022, with Jonah Hill being added to the list of executive producers.

Channel 5 
On April 5, 2021, Callaghan released the first content for Channel 5 through Patreon. The show is created by the same core members of the crew in a similar style to All Gas No Brakes. The first episode was uploaded to YouTube on April 11, 2021, and documented spring breakers in Miami, it was removed by YouTube shortly thereafter due to being accused of spreading COVID-19 misinformation. It was reinstated five days later. His next episode was released on April 29 and was about the trial of Derek Chauvin.

Personal life 
Callaghan has said that he excessively used psilocybin around the age of 13, and suffers from hallucinogen persisting perception disorder as a result.

Sexual misconduct allegations 
In early January 2023, two women posted videos on TikTok accusing Callaghan of trying to pressure them into having sex. Following the initial TikTok videos, a report by The Stranger interviewed two other women who alleged that Callaghan tried to pressure them into having sex and made them uncomfortable. 

On January 12, Callaghan's legal representative responded to the allegations in a statement released to Variety, saying in part: "Conversations about pressure and consent are extremely important and Andrew wants to have these conversations, so he can continue to learn and grow. While every dynamic is open to interpretation and proper communication is critical from all those involved, repeated requests for money should not be part of these conversations." 

On January 15, Callaghan responded to the allegations in a YouTube video, stating that while some of the allegations about him are "not true" or "missing important contextual information", he apologizes for his behavior and plans to begin therapy sessions and attending Alcoholics Anonymous meetings.

On February 28, 2023 The Stranger published an additional story with two women accusing Andrew Callaghan of rape and sexual assault that took place during the Spring of 2017 while attending Loyola University.  Andrew’s rep responded by saying: “Andrew has taken accountability for his role in other situations and will be the first to admit his shortcomings; however, these accusations go further and are complete without merit. Andrew will utilize every option he has in order to clear his name and protect his reputation.”

Filmography

Awards and nominations

References

External links 
 
 
 

1997 births
Living people
21st-century American journalists
American alternative journalists
American male journalists
American YouTubers
American documentary film directors
Journalists from Washington (state)
Journalists from Pennsylvania
People from Seattle
Loyola University New Orleans alumni
Social media influencers